Hu Minghai (born April 19, 1989 in Yueyang, Hunan) is a former Chinese male slalom canoeist specializing in the C2 event. He and his partner Shu Junrong competed together as a team from 2003 to the 2013 National Games.

Early life
Hu was born in Wensheng residential community of Rongjiawan (荣家湾), Yueyang county, Hunan. As a small child he used to go swimming and rowing in a fishing boat behind his parents' back in summer in a pond near his home. He had grown to be an excellent swimmer and rower at the age of eight or nine. He had strong arms and good coordination skills for rowing.

In 2001 it was Sui Hongjun (隋红军), who served as a whitewater slalom coach in Heyuan Water Sports Administration, Guangdong, who discovered Hu's potential in canoeing and recommended Hu to take part in slalom training. In March 2001, Hu went to Heyuan Slalom Team with Sui from Yueyang to start his slalom canoeing career.

Since Hu Minghai entered Heyuan Slalom Team in 2003, Hu and Shu Junrong being at similar age, started competing together in canoe doubles. Hu was picked for the national slalom training team in 2004 and in 2006, he became a full member of the Chinese canoe slalom team. The two-man team gradually became leading figures of Chinese slalom C2 events.

Career 
Hu competed in the Olympic Games twice with Shu, finishing the 10th in 2008 Beijing Olympics and the 6th in 2012 London Olympics. He won the gold medal at 2010 ICF World Cup Race 1 in Prague. It was first time that Chinese paddlers took a win in C2 in ICF World Cup. From 2006 to 2012, he won four gold medals, one silver medal and two bronze medals in the ICF World Cup series, including Asian Championships and Oceanian Championships. From 2005 to 2013, Hu competed in China National Games three times, winning gold in 2009 and 2013 and silver in 2005.

World Cup individual podiums

1 Asia Canoe Slalom Championship counting for World Cup points
2 Oceania Championship counting for World Cup points

Career highlights 
 2013 National Games, gold medal, men's C2
 2012 Olympics, 6th, men's C2
 2010 Asian Games, gold medal, men's C2
 2010 Asian Championships, gold medal, men's C2
 2009 National Games, gold medal, men's C2
 2009 Canoe slalom world championships, 8th, men's C2 (details)
 2008 Olympics, 10th, men's C2
 2008 Canoe Slalom World Cup event Czech Prague, silver medal, men's C2 (details)
 2008 Canoe Slalom World Cup event Australia Penrith, gold medal, men's C2 (details)
 2007 Canoe Slalom World Cup Race 1 – Prague, Czech, bronze medal, men's C2 (details)
 2005 National Games, silver medal, men's C2
 2005 Holiday Cup National canoe slalom championships – Zijin Huang Tang slalom base, gold medal, men's C2 (details)

References

1989 births
Living people
People from Yueyang
People from Heyuan
Sportspeople from Hunan
Olympic canoeists of China
Canoeists at the 2008 Summer Olympics
Canoeists at the 2012 Summer Olympics
Asian Games medalists in canoeing
Canoeists at the 2010 Asian Games
Asian Games gold medalists for China
Chinese male canoeists
Medalists at the 2010 Asian Games